Verschoten & Zoon was a 1999 Belgian comedy TV series. It was directed by Wim Feyaerts and written by Bart Cooreman and was produced in the Dutch language. It ran until 2007. 

The show was a sitcom starring Jacques Vermeire as the proprietor of a garage. Actress Grietje Vanderheijden also made an appearance.

External links

Flemish television shows
Belgian television sitcoms
1999 Belgian television series debuts
2007 Belgian television series endings
Television shows set in Belgium
VTM (TV channel) original programming